The C.L. Schmitt Bridge (commonly known as the New Kensington Bridge or the Ninth Street Bridge) is a truss bridge that carries vehicular traffic across the Allegheny River between  New Kensington and East Deer Township, Pennsylvania in the United States.

History
The bridge was constructed in 1927 to connect Pennsylvania Route 56 (PA 56), which has its terminus on the New Kensington side of the bridge, and PA 28, the major westbank artery. Today, PA 28 has become a freeway, and the former highway is known as Freeport Road. The bridge is named for former Democratic State Senator C. L. Schmitt, who represented a suburban and rural district on the eastbank of the Allegheny and who is considered the father of consumer protection laws.

See also
List of crossings of the Allegheny River

External links
 C.L. Schmitt Bridge at Pghbridges.com
 

Bridges over the Allegheny River
Bridges in Allegheny County, Pennsylvania
Bridges in Westmoreland County, Pennsylvania
Road bridges in Pennsylvania
Steel bridges in the United States